Joakim Svalberg is a Swedish musician best known as the current keyboard player for the Swedish progressive metal band Opeth, which he joined in late 2011 just after the recording of the album Heritage. Svalberg is also involved with a band named elGamo, whose first record he is currently working on.

Influences
According to Opeth.com, Svalberg's primary influences are: Gentle Giant, Edgar Winter, Buddy Miles, Yes, King's X, Pink Floyd, Genesis (with Peter Gabriel), The Beatles, Be-Bop Deluxe, Mahavishnu Orchestra, Deep Purple, Faces, National Health, U.K., David Bowie, Black Sabbath, Rainbow, Robert Fripp, Wool, Manfred Mann's Earth Band and Le Mystère des Voix Bulgares.

Discography

with Qoph
Kalejdoskopiska Aktiviteter (1998)
Pyrola (2004)

with Yngwie J. Malmsteen
G3: Rockin' in the Free World (2004)
Unleash the Fury (2005)

with Opeth
Heritage (2011) – (Track 1)
Pale Communion (2014)
Sorceress (2016)
In Cauda Venenum (2019)

with elGamo
TBA (2012)

with Berggren/Kerslake Band
The Sun Has Gone Hazy (2014)

References

External links 
 Opeth official website

1969 births
Living people
Swedish male musicians
Musicians from Stockholm
Opeth members
Yngwie J. Malmsteen's Rising Force members